Rivarol may refer to:
 Antoine de Rivarol (1753–1801), French writer
Rivarol, French magazine published since 1951